Firefighting in Antarctica encompasses various organizations and procedures designed to fight fires on the continent of Antarctica. Firefighting in Antarctica is complicated by the harsh conditions of the continent, the remoteness of the locations to be serviced, and the importance of protecting life-supporting shelter from immolation.

Conditions and considerations
Although there are no wildfires in Antarctica, fire represents a serious threat to human activity. Antarctica is the windiest place on earth, so there are often winds sufficient to quickly fan any flames. Due to the low temperatures, liquid water is often hard to obtain in large quantity.

Because of the harsh conditions, shelter is a necessity of life and significant loss of shelter to fire could be disastrous to the survival of a base's residents, exacerbated by the remoteness of the bases from outside aid. Because of this, bases in Antarctica are often designed to mitigate the devastation of a fire by being made up of a number of separate buildings with a significant distance between them.

In addition, many Antarctic bases have emergency supplies stored near to the base, but far enough away that even a large fire will not immolate them. If the base burns, the supplies are intended to be sufficient for base personnel to survive until help can arrive.

Antarctic Fire Department

The Antarctic Fire Department is based at McMurdo Station. It is the only full-time professional fire department in Antarctica, and the largest and best equipped.

The department maintains two fire stations at McMurdo: Station 1 is at central McMurdo and Station 2 serves the station's airfields. The Station 1 fleet consists of two fire engines, a water tender, an ambulance, a rescue vehicle, and a SCAT (Self Contained Attack Truck) firefighting vehicle. The Station 2 fleet consists of an ambulance and seven ARFF (Aircraft Rescue Fire Fighting) vehicles, which are fully tracked to handle the deeper snowcover that surrounds the runways. Station 2 apparatus is distributed and dispatched to different airfields depending on the current flight activity.

During the Antarctic summer (October–February), McMurdo's population is at its highest, and the Antarctic Fire Department maintains a staff of about 46, including 21 firefighters (the other personnel being dispatchers, lieutenants, and command staff). In the winter (February–August), McMurdo's resident population declines to 200 or less and the Antarctic Fire Department staffing decreases to twelve.

As well as fires and fire alarms, the department handles medical calls, hazmat spills, odor investigations, assists, dive emergencies, and other tasks as needed (including herding seals and penguins off runways for incoming flights). Department dispatchers monitor all off-base foot travel, and all off-base vehicle movements during extreme weather.

Southernmost Fire Department
The Southernmost Fire Department serves the American South Pole Station.

Firefighting at South Pole Station was long the responsibility of a volunteer fire brigade, staffed by station personnel, who receive one week of training. Because of the cold climate, dry chemicals rather than water are usually used to extinguish fires.

In the twenty-first century, a professional contingent of six firefighters of the Antarctic Fire Department, designated as Station 3, was added to the station for the summer months.

Other fire departments
Other research stations in Antarctica, such as Vostok Station (Russia), Scott Base (New Zealand), and Terra Nova Station (Italy) are protected by part-time fire brigades.

Fires in Antarctica
The first known fire in Antarctica was during the British Southern Cross Expedition of 1898–1900, when a candle set fire to a hut and nearly burned it down, which would have been disastrous to the expedition.

The British Hope Bay Station was completely destroyed by fire in 1948. Two of the three staff were killed, the lone survivor lived alone in a tent for sixteen days until rescued.

On April 12, 1984, the Argentine leader of the Almirante Brown Base burned the entire base down on purpose to avoid having to stay the winter. There were no injuries and personnel were evacuated by a United States Navy ship.

The Comandante Ferraz Antarctic Station fire at Brazil's Comandante Ferraz Antarctic Station on February 25, 2012, destroyed much of the station, and materials and equipment used for research. Two people were killed and another injured.

On October 5, 2008, a building at the Russian Progress Station burned down, with one person being killed and two seriously injured, and radio contact with the outside world being lost for a few days.

References

External links
Antarctic Fire Department website

 
Fire departments of the United States